The 1972 USC Trojans baseball team represented the University of Southern California in the 1972 NCAA University Division baseball season. The team was coached Rod Dedeaux in his 31st season.

The Trojans won the College World Series, defeating the Arizona State Sun Devils in the championship game, winning their third of five consecutive national championships, and fourth in five years.

Roster

Schedule 

! style="background:#FFCC00;color:#990000;"| Regular Season
|- 

|- align="center" bgcolor="#ffdddd"
| February 18 ||  || 4–5 || 0–1 || –
|- align="center" bgcolor="ddffdd"
| February 22 ||  || 7–4 || 1–1 || –
|- align="center" bgcolor="#ffdddd"
| February 26 || UC Santa Barbara || 4–5 || 1–2 || –
|- align="center" bgcolor="#ddffdd"
| February 26 || UC Santa Barbara || 9–6 || 2–2 || –
|- align="center" bgcolor="#ddffdd"
| February 29 ||  || 2–0 || 3–2 || –
|-

|- align="center" bgcolor="ddffdd"
| March 1 ||  || 12–7 || 4–2 || –
|- align="center" bgcolor="ffdddd"
| March 3 ||  || 5–10 || 4–3 || –
|- align="center" bgcolor="ddffdd"
| March 7 ||  || 17–3 || 5–3 || –
|- align="center" bgcolor="ddffdd"
| March 8 || at Loyola Marymount || 6–10 || 6–3 || –
|- align="center" bgcolor="ddffdd"
| March 10 || at  || 8–5 || 7–3 || –
|- align="center" bgcolor="ffdddd"
| March 11 || at Fresno State || 4–5 || 7–4 || –
|- align="center" bgcolor="ddffdd"
| March 11 || at Fresno State || 12–4 || 8–4 || –
|- align="center" bgcolor="ddffdd"
| March 14 ||  || 9–8 || 9–4 || –
|- align="center" bgcolor="ddffdd"
| March 15 || at  || 6–0 || 10–4 || –
|- align="center" bgcolor="ddffdd"
| March 17 ||  || 4–2 || 11–4 || –
|- align="center" bgcolor="ddffdd"
| March 18 || San Diego State || 8–4 || 12–4 || –
|- align="center" bgcolor="ddffdd"
| March 18 || San Diego State || 6–2 || 13–4 || –
|- align="center" bgcolor="ddffdd"
| March 22 || at San Fernando Valley State || 12–2 || 14–4 || –
|- align="center" bgcolor="ddffdd"
| March 23 ||  || 10–2 || 15–4 || –
|- align="center" bgcolor="ffdddd"
| March 24 || at  || 2–6 || 15–5 || –
|- align="center" bgcolor="ddffdd"
| March 25 || at Arizona || 5–3 || 16–5 || –
|- align="center" bgcolor="ddffdd"
| March 25 || at Arizona || 2–1 || 17–5 || –
|- align="center" bgcolor="ddffdd"
| March 30 || vs.  || 12–10 || 18–5 || –
|- align="center" bgcolor="ddffdd"
| March 31 || at  || 4–0 || 19–5 || –
|-

|- align="center" bgcolor="ddffdd"
| April 1 || vs.  || 6–0 || 20–5 || –
|- align="center" bgcolor="ddffdd"
| April 4 ||  || 4–2 || 21–5 || –
|- align="center" bgcolor="ffdddd"
| April 7 ||  || 0–2 || 21–6 || 0–1
|- align="center" bgcolor="ffdddd"
| April 8 || Stanford || 1–2 || 21–7 || 0–2
|- align="center" bgcolor="ddffdd"
| April 8 || Stanford || 3–2 || 22–7 || 1–2
|- align="center" bgcolor="ffdddd"
| April 10 || Cal Poly Pomona || 5–6 || 22–8 || –
|- align="center" bgcolor="ffdddd"
| April 11 ||  || 1–2 || 22–9 || –
|- align="center" bgcolor="ddffdd"
| April 14 || at  || 11–5 || 23–9 || 2–2
|- align="center" bgcolor="ddffdd"
| April 15 || at California || 2–1 || 24–9 || 3–2
|- align="center" bgcolor="ddffdd"
| April 15 || at California || 7–6 || 25–9 || 4–2
|- align="center" bgcolor="#ddffdd"
| April 21 ||  || 2–1 || 26–9 || 5–2
|- align="center" bgcolor="#ddffdd"
| April 22 || at UCLA || 5–2 || 27–9 || 6–2
|- align="center" bgcolor="#ddffdd"
| April 22 || at UCLA || 10–0 || 28–9 || 7–2
|- align="center" bgcolor="ddffdd"
| April 25 || at  || 14–4 || 29–9 || –
|- align="center" bgcolor="#ddddff"
| April 28 || California || 10–0 || 29–9–1 || –
|- align="center" bgcolor="#ddffdd"
| April 29 || California || 3–2 || 30–9–1 || 8–2
|- align="center" bgcolor="#ddffdd"
| April 29 || California || 8–0 || 31–9–1 || 9–2
|- align="center" bgcolor="#ddffdd"
| April 30 || California || 10–3 || 32–9–1 || 10–2
|-

|- align="center" bgcolor="#ddffdd"
| May 2 || Cal State Los Angeles || 4–0 || 33–9–1 || –
|- align="center" bgcolor="#ffdddd"
| May 3 || at Chapman || 8–14 || 33–10–1 || –
|- align="center" bgcolor="#ddffdd"
| May 5 || at Stanford || 4–3 || 34–10–1 || 11–2
|- align="center" bgcolor="#ffdddd"
| May 6 || at Stanford || 4–3 || 34–10–1 || 11–3
|- align="center" bgcolor="#ddffdd"
| May 6 || at Stanford || 10–7 || 35–11–1 || 12–3
|- align="center" bgcolor="#ddffdd"
| May 9 || Long Beach State || 6–1 || 36–11–1 || –
|- align="center" bgcolor="#ddffdd"
| May 12 || at UCLA || 8–6 || 37–11–1 || 13–3
|- align="center" bgcolor="#ddffdd"
| May 13 || UCLA || 9–2 || 38–11–1 || 14–3
|- align="center" bgcolor="#ffdddd"
| May 13 || UCLA || 6–7 || 38–12–1 || 14–4
|-

|-
! style="background:#FFCC00;color:#990000;"| Post–Season
|-

|- align="center" bgcolor="ddffdd"
| May 19 || vs. Washington State || Bovard Field || 6–1 || 39–12–1
|- align="center" bgcolor="ddffdd"
| May 20 || vs. Washington State || Bovard Field || 8–7 || 40–12–1
|-

|- align="center" bgcolor="ddffdd"
| May 27 || vs. UC Santa Barbara || Campus Diamond || 9–5 || 41–12–1
|- align="center" bgcolor="ddffdd"
| May 28 || vs. UC Santa Barbara || Campus Diamond || 13–6 || 42–12–1
|-

|- align="center" bgcolor="ddffdd"
| June 9 || vs. Mississippi || Rosenblatt Stadium || 8–6 || 43–12–1
|- align="center" bgcolor="ddffdd"
| June 11 || vs.  || Rosenblatt Stadium || 5–4 || 44–12–1
|- align="center" bgcolor="ffdddd"
| June 12 || vs. Arizona State || Rosenblatt Stadium || 0–3 || 44–13–1
|- align="center" bgcolor="ddffdd"
| June 14 || vs. Texas || Rosenblatt Stadium || 4–3 || 45–13–1
|- align="center" bgcolor="ddffdd"
| June 15 || vs. Arizona State || Rosenblatt Stadium || 3–1 || 46–13–1
|- align="center" bgcolor="ddffdd"
| June 16 || vs. Arizona State || Rosenblatt Stadium || 1–0 || 47–13–1
|-

Awards and honors 
Daryl Arenstein
 College World Series All-Tournament Team

Same Ceci
 College World Series All-Tournament Team
 All-Pacific-8 First Team

Fred Lynn
 All-America First Team
 All-Pacific-8 First Team

Russ McQueen
 College World Series Most Outstanding Player

Roy Smalley
 All-Pacific-8 First Team

Tim Steele
 College World Series All-Tournament Team
 All-Pacific-8 First Team

Greg Widman
 All-Pacific-8 First Team

Trojans in the 1972 MLB Draft 
The following members of the USC baseball program were drafted in the 1972 Major League Baseball Draft.

January regular draft

References 

USC
USC Trojans baseball seasons
College World Series seasons
NCAA Division I Baseball Championship seasons
Pac-12 Conference baseball champion seasons
USC Trojans